Cassine laneana, commonly known as the Bermuda olivewood, is a species of large tree in the staff vine family, Celastraceae, that is endemic to the islands of Bermuda. Although once found in the extensive subtropical coniferous forests that covered the islands, it is currently restricted to small protected areas, such as Spittal Pond. The leaves are also a deep green colour when they are older and a bright green colour when they are younger.

The Bermuda olivewood did not have very much use in Bermuda's history, although it played a huge part in it. It has huge boughs that are highly woody. The crown is naturally grown into a sphere shape. C. laneana is often used as an ornamental tree, lining the streets of Hamilton and providing shade in the Bermuda Botanical Gardens.

See also
 Flora and fauna in Bermuda

Gallery

References

External links

laneana
Trees of Bermuda
Vulnerable plants
Taxobox binomials not recognized by IUCN